Church (also Church Village, Churchtown) is an unincorporated community in Allamakee County, Iowa, United States.

History
 Church was incorporated in 1896.
It had a post office and telephone office for many years.  A creamery also used to operate in the town.

Church's population was 25 in 1925.

Notes

Unincorporated communities in Allamakee County, Iowa
Unincorporated communities in Iowa
1896 establishments in Iowa